Baruch Feinberg (ברוך פיינברג; August 6, 1933 – May 17, 2007) was an Israeli Olympic javelin thrower. When he competed in the Olympics, he was aged 6 (182 cm), and weighed 159 lbs (72 kg).

Javelin career
He was the Israeli champion in the javelin throw from 1962–66 and 1968-69.  His personal best in the javelin throw is 70.70 (1960). He won the bronze medal at the 1958 Asian Games in the javelin, with a throw of 63.78. He competed for Israel at the 1960 Summer Olympics in Rome, at the age of 27, in Athletics--Men's Javelin Throw, and came in 24th with a throw of 68.24.

References

External links

1933 births
2007 deaths
Athletes (track and field) at the 1960 Summer Olympics
Israeli male javelin throwers
Olympic athletes of Israel
Asian Games medalists in athletics (track and field)
Athletes (track and field) at the 1958 Asian Games
Asian Games bronze medalists for Israel
Medalists at the 1958 Asian Games